Limbenii Vechi is a commune in Glodeni District, Moldova.

References

Villages of Glodeni District